Charles Frederick Zitting (March 30, 1894 – July 14, 1954) was a Mormon fundamentalist leader of the community in Short Creek, Arizona.

Life
Zitting's ancestors came to the United States from Sweden, Denmark, Canada, and Britain.

Fundamentalism
Zitting began his rise in the leadership of the Mormon fundamentalist Short Creek Community when he was arrested on April 1, 1931 on charges of polygamy and bailed out by Lorin C. Woolley, J. Leslie Broadbent, and Joseph W. Musser the next day. After the three paid his bail, Zitting was asked to join the Council of Friends and was ordained to that position months later. He was set apart as High Priest Apostle the same day he was ordained to the Council.

While serving on the Council of Friends, Zitting largely served under LeGrand Woolley, who in turn served under Joseph W. Musser. Woolley led the fundamentalist community at Short Creek while Musser led the community in and around Salt Lake City, Utah. The group near Salt Lake City would later become known as the Apostolic United Brethren, while those remaining in the Short Creek Community would later become the Fundamentalist Church of Jesus Christ of Latter-Day Saints under Leroy S. Johnson.

With Musser's death and Woolley's presence in Salt Lake City, Zitting was left to take charge for the Council of Friends and the Short Creek Community following the Short Creek raid. Leroy S. Johnson assisted Zitting in most of the everyday decisions.

Zitting served as the senior member of the Council of Friends for four months until his death. He was survived by "5 wives, 18 sons, 16 daughters and many grandchildren."

See also
 List of Mormon fundamentalist leaders
 Mormonism and polygamy

Notes

References

.

External links
 

1894 births
1954 deaths
American Latter Day Saint leaders
Mormon fundamentalist leaders
People from Weber County, Utah
People from Short Creek Community